Mini-budget may refer to:

July 2020 United Kingdom summer statement, also known as the Coronavirus mini-budget
September 2020 United Kingdom Winter Economy Plan, sometimes referred to as a mini-budget
September 2022 United Kingdom mini-budget, a fiscal event that led to market disruption and the fall of the Liz Truss government

See also
 Spring Statement, sometimes referred to as a mini-budget